Brachyponera chinensis, or the Asian needle ant, is a ponerine ant native to areas of Japan and Asia. The species can also be found in the United States, where it is an adventive and possibly invasive species. It is documented from Georgia, Kentucky, North Carolina, South Carolina, and Virginia, though unpublished records place it in Alabama and Tennessee. Sightings have been confirmed as far north as Maryland. The pest species is of growing concern due to ecological impacts on biodiversity and medical risks to human health, via sting-induced anaphylaxis. It prefers nesting in dark, damp areas in soil beneath stones, logs, stumps, and debris.

The Asian needle ant and the Argentine ant (Linepithema humile) have been battling for territory in the U.S.

References

External links

Ponerinae
Insects described in 1895